Events in the year 2022 in Brunei.

Incumbents

Events 
Ongoing – COVID-19 pandemic in Brunei

 25 AugustBrunei Sultan Hassanal Bolkiah concludes a two day state visit to Singapore. Four Memorandums of Understanding are signed during the trip.
 31 AugustBangladeshi Foreign secretary Masud Bin Momen attends a foreign office consultation meeting in Brunei.

References 

 

 
2020s in Brunei
Years of the 21st century in Brunei
Brunei
Brunei